The Brighton, Worthing & District Football League is a football competition involving teams in and around Brighton, Hove and Worthing in England. It was established in 2014 following a merger between the Brighton, Hove & District League (formed 1903) and the Worthing & District League. Winners of the Premier Division may apply for promotion to the West Sussex Football League Championship South. The number of teams has steadily reduced each year with the league down to one division in 2020/21. Some teams have transferred to the West Sussex League where the larger number of divisions result in more even competition.

Champions

References

External links
Official website

Football leagues in England
Football in East Sussex
Football in West Sussex
2014 establishments in England
Sports leagues established in 2014